Árpád Szántó (10 October 1889 – September 1984) was a Hungarian wrestler. He competed in the lightweight event at the 1912 Summer Olympics.

References

External links
 

1889 births
1984 deaths
Olympic wrestlers of Hungary
Wrestlers at the 1912 Summer Olympics
Hungarian male sport wrestlers
People from Târgu Secuiesc